Arabinofuranosylcytosine triphosphate is a nucleotide that inhibits the synthesis of DNA by acting as an antimetabolic agent against deoxycytidine (a component of DNA).  It is the biologically active form of cytarabine.

References

Nucleotides
Pyrimidones
Arabinosides
Phosphate esters